High River was a single member territorial electoral district in Northwest Territories Canada that elected members to the Legislative Assembly of the Northwest Territories from 1894 until 1905.

Electoral history
The electoral district was created under the revised North-West Representation Act that was passed through the Parliament of Canada in 1894. The electoral district was created out of the old Calgary electoral district to meet the requirement of 2,500 residents per electoral district as outlined in the Northwest Territories Act.

After Alberta and Saskatchewan were created, the electoral district was abolished in 1905. A new High River district was created to elect members to the Legislative Assembly of Alberta.

Members of the Legislative Assembly (MLAs)

Election results

1894 election

1898 election

1902 election

References

External links
Website of the Legislative Assembly of Northwest Territories

Former electoral districts of Northwest Territories